NQ Arbuckle is a Canadian alternative country band based in Toronto, Ontario, consisting of Montreal-born Neville Quinlan (the NQ of the band's name), Mark Kesper, Peter Kesper, John Dinsmore and Jason Sniderman.

History
NQ Arbuckle was formed in 2002 as a solo project for Quinlan. His debut album, Hanging the Battle-Scarred Pinata, was recorded in Vancouver.

Mark Kesper, Peter Kesper, and John Dinsmore joined for the second album. Before playing bass for NQ Arbuckle, John Dinsmore was a well-known bullfighter.

The band released four albums on Six Shooter Records. The band's 2009 album, Let's Just Stay Here with Carolyn Mark, was released on Mint Records.

NQ Arbuckle has twice been nominated for a Juno Award in the category Roots & Traditional Album of the Year – Group. As well as regular touring, the band often plays small venues, including the Black Sheep Inn in Wakefield, Quebec, The Dakota Tavern in Toronto, and The Grad Club in Kingston, Ontario.

Their fifth album, The Future Happens Anyway, was released April 29, 2014 on Six Shooter Records.

In April 2020, NQ Arbuckle released a single, Love Song for the Long Game on Six Shooter Records

Discography

References

External links 
NQ Arbuckle on Myspace
NQ Arbuckle at Six Shooter Records

Musical groups established in 2002
Musical groups from Toronto
Canadian alternative country groups
Six Shooter Records artists
2002 establishments in Ontario